is a Japanese singer, actress, YouTuber and a former idol. She is a former member of the idol group AKB48. She was the second General Manager of the AKB48 Group. She had served as the captain of AKB48 Team A, and was a former member of AKB48 sister group NMB48. From 2011 to 2015, Yokoyama had also been also a member of the group Not Yet.

Biography 
Yokoyama's first attempt to join AKB48 or a sister group was for SKE48's second generation, but her audition was unsuccessful. She later passed the auditions with AKB48, and became a ninth-generation kenkyusei (trainee) member on September 20, 2009. She was the first of her generation to be promoted, which took place at AKB48 Tokyo Matsuri on October 10, 2010, and where she became a member of Team K.

In 2011, she secured her first participation on an AKB48 single title track by placing 19th in the AKB48 general elections. Her first A-side single was "Everyday, Katyusha".

In 2012, she placed 15th in the AKB48 general elections.

In the AKB48 Tokyo Dome Concert in 2012, it was announced that Yokoyama would join NMB48 and therefore hold a concurrent position between AKB48's Team A and NMB48. In the same year in November, she sang on the A-side for NMB48's sixth single "Kitagawa Kenji".

In 2013, she placed 13th in the AKB48 general election and third in its rock-paper-scissors tournament. On April 28, 2013, NMB48 revoked her concurrency and she remained in AKB48.

On December 8, 2014, it was revealed that Yokoyama would succeed Minami Takahashi's job as the General Director of AKB48 after Takahashi's leaving. With the graduation of Minami Takahashi scheduled on April 8, 2016, she became the second "Soukantoku" on December 8, 2015 during the 10th anniversary stage of AKB48 Theater.

On March 31, 2019, Yokoyama stepped down from the position of General Manager and became a regular member. Mion Mukaichi officially assumed the title the next day. In November 2019, Yokoyama acted in Battles Without Honor and Humanity: On'na-tachi no Shitō-hen, a stage adaptation of the Battles Without Honor and Humanity yakuza film series. She played the role of Shozo Hirono, based on Bunta Sugawara's original portrayal.

On December 16, 2020, Yokoyama's official website, named "YuiFan's", was launched.

On September 12, 2021, Yokoyama announced her graduation from AKB48. Her graduation concert was held on November 27, 2021 at Pacifico Yokohama and her final performance at the AKB48 Theater was held on December 9, 2021.

Discography

Singles with AKB48

Singles with NMB48

Not Yet singles 
 "Shūmatsu Not Yet"
 "Naminori Kakigōri"
 "Perapera Perao"
 "Suika Baby"
 "Hirihiri no Hana"

Appearances

Variety shows
 AKBingo!
 Naruhodo High School
 NMB Genin!!

TV dramas
  (NTV, 2011), Otabe
  (TV Tokyo, 2014), Member of idol group, Milk Planet; Yui
  (NTV, 2015), Otabe
  (NTV, 2015), Otabe
  Ep.41 - Remake, and Ep.42 - Remake ~Another~ (TV Asahi, 2016), Noriko
  Ep.21 - A Farewell Time (TV Asahi, 2016), Miyu
  (Hulu, 2016), Chisa Furugōri
  (NTV, 2016), Otabe (Maguro)
  (TV Asahi, 2017), Yui Yokoyama/Long-Speech Yokoyama

Films
 NMB48 Geinin! The Movie Owarai Seishun Girls! (2013), herself
 Yume wa Ushi no Oishasan (2014), narration
 NMB48 Geinin! The Movie Returns Sotsugyō! Owarai Seishun Girls!! Aratanaru Tabidachi (2014), cameo

Stage plays
 Utsukushiku Aoku (美しく青く) (2019)
Battles Without Honor and Humanity: On'na-tachi no Shitō-hen (2019) - Shozo Hirono
 Catch Me If You Can (2022) - Brenda Strong

Bibliography

Photobooks
 Yuihan (February 5, 2015, Gakken Publishing) 
 AKB48 Yokoyama Yui - Graduation Memorial Book (Riding on Midnight Bus), (November 27, 2021, KOBUNSHA)

References

External links 
  
 Agent Profile  
  
 

Living people
1992 births
Actresses from Kyoto Prefecture
Japanese women pop singers
AKB48 members
NMB48 members
Japanese idols
Musicians from Kyoto Prefecture
21st-century Japanese women singers
21st-century Japanese singers
21st-century Japanese actresses